Tracy Kristine Nelson (born October 25, 1963) is an American actress. From a long line of entertainers, she is the daughter of musician Ricky Nelson and actress and painter Kristin Nelson.

Early life 
Nelson was born in Santa Monica, California. She is a fourth-generation performer. Her great-grandparents were vaudeville performers Hazel Dell (née McNutt) and Roy Hilliard Snyder. Their daughter was her paternal grandmother Harriet Nelson, the star of the ABC-TV sitcom The Adventures of Ozzie and Harriet from 1952-1966. Her parents were musician / film actor Ricky Nelson and actress/artist Kristin Nelson (née Harmon). She has three younger siblings: Matthew Nelson and Gunnar Nelson of the 1990s rock group Nelson, and Sam Nelson. Her paternal grandparents were Ozzie and Harriet Hilliard Nelson. Nelson's maternal grandparents were football star Tom Harmon, a Heisman Trophy winner from the University of Michigan, and actress Elyse Knox. She is also the niece of actors David Nelson, and her mother's siblings Mark Harmon and Kelly Harmon.

She went to The Buckley School and graduated in 1981 from the Westlake School for Girls (now Harvard-Westlake School) in Los Angeles. She attended Bard College in upstate New York, studying Dance and European History.

Career 
Nelson started her career early; her first role was as herself at age three months on her grandparents' television show.

At age four she played one of Henry Fonda and Lucille Ball's daughters in Yours, Mine and Ours (1968). Her future co-star Tom Bosley also appeared in that movie.

Nelson is a professional dancer, having studied ballet for 17 years with Tania Lachine and toured throughout California in a dance company while still in grammar school. Nelson studied theater with Kim Stanley and Nina Foch and briefly in the United Kingdom, performing in The Edinburgh Fringe Festival after graduation from high school. In 1982, she played "valley girl" Jennifer DeNuccio on the television series Square Pegs, and in 1986 she landed the role of the anorexic daughter in Paul Mazursky's film Down and Out in Beverly Hills.

Nelson co-starred in the television series The Father Dowling Mysteries as "Sister Stephanie" for its three seasons. She was also a series regular on Aaron Spelling's Glitter, A League of Their Own, and the Australian television series The Man From Snowy River. Throughout the 1980s and 1990s Nelson made guest appearances on television series including Family Ties, St. Elsewhere, Murphy Brown, The Nanny, 7th Heaven, Melrose Place, Will and Grace, Matlock, Diagnosis Murder, and Seinfeld. She was in the touring company and on Broadway as "Rizzo" in Grease in 1995. Nelson has appeared in several theatrical releases and over 20 television movies, including The Perfect Nanny in 2000, The Perfect Husband, Kate's Secret, The Fight for Jesse, and The Rival in 2006.

She has written a book about her personal experience and a movie script about her family "The Nelsons."

Personal life 
She married actor William R. Moses in 1987. They divorced in 1997 and share a daughter, actress Remington Elizabeth Moses, born in 1992. Nelson had a son, Elijah Nelson Clark, with Chris Clark in 2001.

Nelson has survived three kinds of cancer. She was diagnosed with stage 2 Hodgkin's Lymphoma a month after her 1987 marriage to Moses, and one year after her father was killed in an aircraft crash on New Year's Eve 1985 in a field in DeKalb, Texas. Nelson went into remission after surgery, chemotherapy (ABVD) and radiation at Cedars-Sinai Hospital in Los Angeles, California.

Having suffered trauma from radiation, Nelson was diagnosed with thyroid cancer in 2005 and breast cancer in 2010. She fully recovered from a bilateral mastectomy and complete reconstruction.

Nelson is active in cancer research advocacy and was the spokesperson for The Lymphoma Research Foundation of America. She received the "Lifesaver Award" from that organization and the "Jill Ireland Award" from the Amie Karen Cancer Fund for Children.

Filmography

References

External links 

 
 
 Tracy Nelson Biography at Film Reference
 Tracy Nelson at Biography Channel

1963 births
20th-century American actresses
21st-century American actresses
American child actresses
American film actresses
American television actresses
Living people
Actresses from Santa Monica, California
Harvard-Westlake School alumni
Bard College alumni